This list of gold mines in Australia is subsidiary to the list of mines article and lists working, defunct and planned mines in the country organised by state.

New South Wales
Cadia-Ridgeway Mine
Northparkes 
Peak Mines
Tomingley 
Cowal
Hera

Queensland
Mount Morgan Mine
Cracow, Queensland
Pajingo, Queensland
Mt Carlton, Queensland

South Australia

Tasmania
Henty Gold Mine
Mount Dundas (Tasmania)
Mount Jukes Mine sites
Mount Read (Tasmania)
Beaconsfield Gold Mine

Victoria
A1 gold mine
Ballarat gold mine
Fosterville Gold Mine
Stawell Gold Mine

Western Australia

See also
 Mining in Australia

References

 
Gold
Australia